From Here to Infinity: A Guide to Today's Mathematics, a 1996 book by mathematician and science popularizer Ian Stewart, is a guide to modern mathematics for the general reader. It aims to answer questions such as "What is mathematics?", "What is it for " and "What are mathematicians doing nowadays?". Author Simon Singh describes it as "An interesting and accessible account of current mathematical topics".

Summary
After an introductory chapter The Nature of Mathematics, Stewart devotes each of the following 18 chapters to an exposition of a particular problem that has given rise to new mathematics or an area of research in modern mathematics.

Chapter 2 - The Price of Primality - primality tests and integer factorisation
Chapter 3 - Marginal Interest - Fermat's Last Theorem
Chapter 4 - Parallel Thinking - non-Euclidean geometry
Chapter 5 - The Miraculous Jar - Cantor's theorem and cardinal numbers
Chapter 6 - Ghosts of Departed Quantities - calculus and non-standard analysis
Chapter 7 - The Duellist and the Monster - the classification of finite simple groups
Chapter 8 - The Purple Wallflower - the four colour theorem
Chapter 9 - Much Ado About Knotting - topology and the Poincaré conjecture
Chapter 10 - More Ado About Knotting - knot polynomials
Chapter 11 - Squarerooting the Unsquarerootable - complex numbers and the Riemann hypothesis
Chapter 12 - Squaring the Unsquarable - the Banach-Tarski paradox
Chapter 13 - Strumpet Fortune - probability and random walks
Chapter 14 - The Mathematics of Nature - the stability of the Solar System 
Chapter 15 - The Patterns of Chaos - chaos theory and strange attractors
Chapter 16 - The Two-and-a-halfth Dimension - fractals
Chapter 17 - Dixit Algorizmi - algorithms and NP-complete problems
Chapter 18 - The Limits of Computability - Turing machines and computable numbers
Chapter 19 -  The Ultimate in Technology Transfer - experimental mathematics and the relationship between mathematics and science

Editions
Important advances in mathematics necessitated revisions of the book. For example, when the 1st edition came out, Fermat's Last Theorem was still an open problem. By the 3rd edition, it has been solved by Andrew Wiles. Other revised topics include Tarski's circle-squaring problem, Carmichael numbers, and the Kepler Problem.
 1st edition (1987): published under the title The Problems of Mathematics
 2nd edition (1992)
 retitled/revised edition (1996)

References

Books by Ian Stewart (mathematician)
Popular mathematics books